Taylor's climbing salamander (Bolitoglossa taylori) is a species of salamander in the family Plethodontidae.
It is found in Panama and possibly Colombia.
Its natural habitats are subtropical or tropical moist lowland forests and subtropical or tropical moist montane forests.

References

Bolitoglossa
Endemic fauna of Panama
Taxonomy articles created by Polbot
Amphibians described in 1970